Halfway railway station is an intermediate stop on the Snowdon Mountain Railway, halfway along the line and close to the 'Halfway House' cafe on the nearby footpath. A short distance above the station is a path that leads down to the cafe.

The station opened with the railway on 6 April 1896, but both closed the same day following an accident. They reopened on 9 April 1897 without mishap and have operated since except during wartime.

The station has one platform.

References

External links

 The line and its stations, via Snowdon Mountain Railway
 Edwardian 6" map showing the station, overlain with modern satellite images and maps, via National Library of Scotland
 The station and line, via Rail Map Online
 Images of the station and line, via Yahoo

Railway stations in Great Britain opened in 1896
Llanberis
Heritage railway stations in Gwynedd